Maximilian Sax (born 22 November 1992) is an Austrian professional footballer who plays as a forward.

International career
Sax got his first call up to the senior Austria side after Marcel Sabitzer withdrew through injury for 2018 FIFA World Cup qualifiers against Wales and Georgia in September 2017.

References

External links
 

1992 births
Living people
Sportspeople from Baden bei Wien
Association football forwards
Austrian footballers
Austrian Football Bundesliga players
2. Liga (Austria) players
FC Admira Wacker Mödling players
FK Austria Wien players
Footballers from Lower Austria